Tantras is an adventure module published in 1989 for the Dungeons & Dragons fantasy role-playing game.  It is the second of the three-part "Avatar" series, the first being Shadowdale and the third Waterdeep.

Plot summary
Tantras is a Forgotten Realms scenario in which the player characters have been accused of murdering Elminster, so they must break out of prison and journey to the city of Tantras.

Publication history
FRE2 Tantras was written by Ed Greenwood and published by TSR in 1989 as a 48-page booklet with a three pane outer folder. Also included are two fold-out color maps.

Reception

Reviews

References

Forgotten Realms adventures
Role-playing game supplements introduced in 1989